Theta Hydri, Latinized from θ Hydri, is the Bayer designation for a blue-white hued star in the southern constellation of Hydrus. It is faintly visible to the naked eye with an apparent visual magnitude of +5.53. At that distance, the visual magnitude of the star is diminished by an extinction of 0.10 due to interstellar dust.

A stellar classification of B8 III/IV suggests it is an evolving B-type star showing mixed traits of a subgiant or giant star. It is a PGa star – a sub-class of the higher temperature chemically peculiar stars known as mercury-manganese stars (HgMn stars). That is, it displays a rich spectra of singly-ionized phosphorus and gallium, in addition to ionized mercury and manganese. As such, Theta Hydri forms a typical example of this type. The absorption lines for these ionized elements are found to vary, most likely as the result of uneven surface distribution combined with the star's rotation. It is a helium-weak star, having helium lines that are anomalously weak for its spectral type. A weak and variable longitudinal magnetic field has been detected.

There is a nearby companion star of class A0 IV located at an angular separation of  along a position angle of 179°, as of 2002. Schöller et al. (2010) consider this to be a visual companion, although Eggleton and Tokovinin (2008) listed the pair as a probable binary star system.

References

B-type giants
B-type subgiants
Mercury-manganese stars
Helium-weak stars

Hydrus (constellation)
Hydri, Theta
0939
Durchmusterung objects
019400
014131